The Sports Name of the Year is an annual award presented to the Danish sportsperson or team judged to have delivered the best performance of the year. The award was inaugurated in 1991 and is awarded jointly by the National Olympic Committee and Sports Confederation of Denmark (Danmarks Idrætsforbund, DIF) and Team Danmark; prior to 2019, DIF presented the award with the newspaper Jyllands-Posten. In addition to the award the winner is granted a monetary prize, which as of 2019 stands at 75,000 Danish kroner.

The Danish women's national handball team have won the award three times, the most of any team or individual. Seven individuals (Mette Jacobsen, Eskild Ebbesen, Thomas Ebert, Tom Kristensen, Caroline Wozniacki, Lasse Norman Hansen and Viktor Axelsen) have won the award twice. The most recent winner is Jonas Vingegaard who was awarded the prize for 2022 in January 2023. He won the 2022 Tour de France.

List of laureates

By year
Numbers in parenthesis indicate a multiple award winner.
The "finalists" column refers to the other nominees shortlisted for the award

By number of wins
The table below lists the individuals and teams who have won Sports Name of the Year more than once.

By sport
The table below lists the total number of Sports Name of the Year awards won by the winners' sporting profession.

References

External links
 Official website of National Olympic Committee and Sports Confederation of Denmark
 
 

National sportsperson-of-the-year trophies and awards
Danish awards
Sport in Denmark
Awards established in 1991
1991 establishments in Denmark